This list is of the Intangible Cultural Properties of Japan in the Prefecture of Ehime.

National Cultural Properties
As of 1 July 2015, zero Important Intangible Cultural Properties have been designated.

Prefectural Cultural Properties
As of 27 March 2015, two properties have been designated at a prefectural level.

Martial Arts

Craft Techniques

Municipal Cultural Properties
As of 1 May 2014, nine properties have been designated at a municipal level.

Intangible Cultural Properties that need measures such as making records
As of 1 July 2015, there was one .

Craft Techniques

References

External links
  Cultural Properties in Ehime Prefecture

Culture in Ehime Prefecture
Ehime